The appointed members of the Legislative Assembly of Macau are members of the Legislative Assembly of Macau who are appointed by the chief executive (and governor during the colonial era).  They are not affiliated to any political party and do not represent any constituency but they are generally loyal to the chief executive. There are currently seven appointed members in the Legislative Assembly.

List of Appointed members after 1999

6th Legislative Assembly (2017–present)
Members appointed by the Chief Executive "Fernando" Chui Sai On
 Ma Chi Seng
 Pang Chuan
 Wu Chou Kit
 Lao Chi Ngai
 Fong Ka Chio
 Iau Teng Pio
 Chan Wa Keong

5th Legislative Assembly (2013–2017)
Members appointed by the Chief Executive "Fernando" Chui Sai On
 Fong Chi Keong
 Vong Hin Fai
 "Dominic" Sio Chi Wai
 Ma Chi Seng
 Tsui Wai Kwan
 "Tommy" Lau Veng Seng
 Tong Io Cheng

4th Legislative Assembly (2009–2013)
Members appointed by the Chief Executive "Fernando" Chui Sai On
 José Chui Sai Peng 
 Ho Sio Kam 
 "Tommy" Lau Veng Seng 
 "Dominic" Sio Chi Wai 
 Tong Io Cheng 
 Tsui Wai Kwan 
 Vong Hin Fai

3rd Legislative Assembly (2005–2009)
Members appointed by the Chief Executive Edmund Ho Hau Wah
 Lei Pui Lam 
 Sam Chan Io 
 Tsui Wai Kwan 
 "José" Chui Sai Peng 
 Philip Xavier 
 Ieong Tou Hong 
 Lao Pun Lap

2nd Legislative Assembly (2001–2005)
Members appointed by the Chief Executive Edmund Ho Hau Wah
 Stanley Au Chong Kit
 Philip Xavier
 Ho Teng Iat
 José Manuel de Oliveira Rodrigues
 Cheong Vai Kei
 Vong Hin Fai
 Tsui Wai Kwan

1st Legislative Assembly (1999–2001)
Members appointed by the Chief Executive Edmund Ho Hau Wah (1999–2001)
 João Baptista Manuel Leão
 Ho Teng Iat
 Stanley Au Chong Kit
 Philip Xavier
 Vong Hin Fai
 Cheong Vai Kei
  José Manuel de Oliveira Rodrigues

List of Appointed members before 1999

7th Legislative Assembly (1996–1999)
Members appointed by the Governor Vasco Joaquim Rocha Vieira
 José João de Deus Rodrigues do Rosário
 Raimundo Arrais do Rosário
 Joaquim Morais Alves
 Joaquim Jorge Perestrelo Neto Valente
 José Manuel de Oliveira Rodrigues
 António José Félix Pontes
 Rui António Craveiro Afonso

6th Legislative Assembly (1992–1996)
Members appointed by the Governor Vasco Joaquim Rocha Vieira
 José João de Deus Rodrigues do Rosário
 Raimundo Arrais do Rosário
 Beatriz Amélia Alves de Sousa Oliveira Basto da Silva
 Joaquim Jorge Perestrelo Neto Valente
 António Correia
 António José Félix Pontes
 Rui António Craveiro Afonso

5th Legislative Assembly (1988–1992)
Members appointed by the Governor Carlos Montez Melancia
 Ana Maria Fortuna de Siqueira Basto Perez
 Anabela Fátima Xavier Sales Ritchie
 Joaquim Jorge Perestrelo Neto Valente
 Philip Xavier
 Rui António Craveiro Afonso

4th Legislative Assembly (1984–1988)
Members appointed by the Governor Vasco de Almeida e Costa
 Carlos Cavaleiro Gonçalves Sanches
 Hoi Sai Un
 Luís Filipe Ferreira Simões
 Pedro Ló da Silva
 Rui António Craveiro Afonso

3rd Legislative Assembly (1980–1984)
Members appointed by the Governor Vasco de Almeida e Costa
 Ho Yin
 Kwong Bing Yun
 Eduardo Jorge Armas Tavares da Silva
 Carlos Cavaleiro Gonçalves Sanches
 Ana Maria Fortuna de Siqueira Basto Perez

2nd Legislative Assembly (1976–1980)
Members appointed by the Governor Nuno Viriato Tavares de Melo Egídio
 Ho Yin
 Kwong Bing Yun
 Mário Figueira Isaac
 Anabela Fátima Xavier Sales Ritchie
 Ana Maria Fortuna de Siqueira Basto Perez

See also
Nominated Member of Parliament
Geographical constituency (Macau)
Functional constituency (Macau)

References

Legislative Assembly of Macau
Constituencies